Lubiatowo may refer to the following places:
Lubiatowo, Greater Poland Voivodeship (west-central Poland)
Lubiatowo, Pomeranian Voivodeship (north Poland)
Lubiatowo, West Pomeranian Voivodeship (north-west Poland)